Cleveland Buckner (August 17, 1938 – October 5, 2006) was an American basketball player. A forward-center from Yazoo City, Mississippi, he played collegiately for the Jackson State University and was selected by the New York Knicks in the 6th round (51st pick overall) of the 1961 NBA Draft.
He played 68 games for the Knicks in the NBA from 1961 to 1963.

After Knicks center Darrall Imhoff fouled out in the second half, Buckner was forced into duty against Wilt Chamberlain during Chamberlain's 100-point game on March 2, 1962. The rookie had a career-high 33 points on 16-of-26 in the field plus 8 rebounds in the historic contest. Starting center Phil Jordon was unavailable because of an injury.

External links

1938 births
2006 deaths
Basketball players from Mississippi
Centers (basketball)
Jackson State Tigers basketball players
New York Knicks draft picks
New York Knicks players
People from Yazoo City, Mississippi
Power forwards (basketball)
American men's basketball players